Kalu Khan is a village located between Shawwa-Adda and Adina village on the main Mardan–Swabi road in Khyber–Pakhtunkhwa province of Pakistan.

Kalu Khan was upgraded to the status of "Tehsil Headquarters" of District Swabi during the ANP (Awami National Party/ملي اولسي ګوند) government term in the province between 2008 and 2013. The tehsil head-quarter although located in Kalukhan is named Tehsil "Razar" and not Tehsil Kalu-Khan.

The people here belong to the Mandanr-Yousafzai (Isapzai in Pashto) branch of Afghans through Mand and his sons.

Razar was one of the four sons of Mand. The other three were Khazar, Mahmood, and Manu. The areas falling under this Tehsil are inhabited by the sons of Razar and Khazar. The people of Kalu Khan are the children of Khazar and therefore Khazarzis of the Mandanr-Ispazis tribe.

Kalu Khan is well known for its production of Kalu Khani thalee dishes in old times and Kalukhanay paroonay (or shawl for women) which is still in vogue. The land is very fertile and produces good quality wheat, sugarcane, tobacco, corn and various vegetables.

It is located at 34°13'0N 72°18'0E with an altitude of 317 meters (1043 feet).

Kalu khan has a hospital that is now upgraded to the Tehsil Headquarters Hospital and a police station which is the oldest in the area. There is a government high school and college for girls with over 2,000 students, and a high school for boys.

The village is surrounded by the villages of Turlanday and Yar-Hussain on the south-east and south-west respectively and by Adina on the west. To the north is Karamar mountain and to north-east is the village Shawwa.

Genealogy of the People: Khazar had four sons namely Shamo, Umar, Yusaf and Ghai. Umar son of Khazar son of Mandanr also had four sons namely Munan, Mama, Bazid and Lodar. Umar and his four sons got the possession of lands of Kalu Khan sometime around the 1530s. The people of Kalukhan are therefore the children of Mandanr through his sons Khazar and Umar.

Beside the Mandanr Isapzais, inhabitants include Akhundzadas, Wardaks, Syeds and Mians (considered as religious and spiritual families) who had come along with the former somewhere between 1490 and 1510 AD from the Kabul region of Afghanistan and got possession of these lands after successful tribal wars and pushing the previous local people across the river Indus. Some other families living in this and surrounding villages are Awans, Kamangars, etc who may or may not be Afghans but were allotted lands after their good performances during the old tribal wars. Some others here did not own any land but provided services to the land-owners.

The name of the village is after a famous 16th-century tribal army general named Malak Kalukhan. The Malak here is an ancient pakhtun title only and is not to be confused with the Malik families of the Punjab. He is believed to have fought the Mughal Emperor of his Era who was Akbar. He fought him for freedom of his states, his tribe and nation. He got several times jailed by Akbar at his capital in Delhi but instead of punishing and torturing him he began to like him because of which he was able to escape.

Like every other village in the Isapzai country, stretching from the plains of present-day Swabi and Mardan in the South to the valleys of Buner and Swat in the north, the land of Kalu-Khan village was equally divided into four families in the early 1500s. These families or khels (in Pashto) are the Munankhel, Mamakhel, Bazidkhel, and Lodarkhel. The entire village was divided into four parts or wands (ونډ) which was then further divided into four and each family received one part in every wand. Family residences, Hujras and Mosques were built at a central raised ground which also served as a vantage point during ancient times.

This division of lands in the entire Isapzai country was completed by Sheikh Malli Baba in the early 1500s on the instructions of Malak Ahmed Khan, a Mandanr himself and the then chief of the tribe. With the passage of time, each family's population has risen manifolds and the inherited land in some cases during the current times is left to a negligible share.

References

Populated places in Swabi District
Union Councils of Swabi District